Ronnie Shields (born June 6, 1958 in Port Arthur, Texas) is a former professional boxer in the featherweight division and is currently a boxing trainer.

Amateur career
Shields had a stellar amateur career.  In 1974 he was the National Junior Olympics Featherweight champion.  In 1975 he was the National Golden Gloves Featherweight champion.  In 1976 and 1978 he was the National Golden Gloves Light welterweight champion.

Shields intended to fly on LOT Polish Airlines Flight 7, where several of his teammates would later be killed, but got sick. His trainer said:
  Both some amateur results and pro results can be found at www.boxrec.com/  under his boxing name Ronnie Shields.

Pro career
Shields turned pro in 1980. After winning 14 out of his first 15 bouts, Shields fought tougher competition and defeated tough journeymen like Pete Podgorski and contender Saoul Mamby.  Then, in 1984 Shields challenged Billy Costello for the WBC light welterweight title, but lost a decision.  In 1986 he took on Tsuyoshi Hamada in Japan for the WBC light welterweight title, but lost a split decision.  He retired in 1988.

Trainer
After his boxing career, Shields has become a prominent trainer in the sport.  He works out of the Plex Boxing Gym in Stafford, Texas. Among the fighters he has worked with are:
 Mike Tyson
 Evander Holyfield
 David Tua
 Pernell Whitaker
 Vernon Forrest
 Arturo Gatti
 Juan Díaz
 Kassim Ouma
 Egerton Marcus
 Dominick Guinn
 Raúl Márquez
 Jesse James Leija
 Jesús Chávez
 Kermit Cintron
 Vanes Martirosyan
 Romallis Ellis
 Tomasz Adamek
 Chris Arreola
 Jermell Charlo
 Artur Szpilka

His current stable includes:

 Erislandy Lara
 Jermall Charlo
 Brian Vera
 Edwin Rodríguez
 Mike Lee
 Steve Lovett
 Guillermo Rigondeaux
 Efe Ajagba
Austin Dulay
Sena Agbeko
Filip “El Animal” Hrgović

Awards and recognition
World Boxing Hall of Fame's Trainer of the Year (2003)

References

External links
 

1958 births
Living people
Featherweight boxers
Boxers from Texas
American boxing trainers
Sportspeople from Port Arthur, Texas
American male boxers